Alexandru Groapă (14 August 1879, Chirileni - 1940) was a Bessarabian politician.

Biography
He served as Member of the Moldovan Parliament (1917–1918).

Gallery

Bibliography
Gheorghe E. Cojocaru, Sfatul Țării: itinerar, Civitas, Chişinău, 1998, 
Mihai Taşcă, Sfatul Țării şi actualele autorităţi locale, "Timpul de dimineaţă", no. 114 (849), June 27, 2008 (page 16)

External links
Arhiva pentru Sfatul Tarii
Deputaţii Sfatului Ţării şi Lavrenti Beria

Notes

Moldovan MPs 1917–1918
People from Ungheni District
1879 births
1940 deaths